Leonard Thomas Wharton (December 13, 1927 – September 30, 2007) was a Canadian professional ice hockey defenceman who played in one National Hockey League game for the New York Rangers during the 1944–45 season, on March 4, 1945 against the Toronto Maple Leafs. The rest of his career, which lasted from 1944 to 1954, was spent in the minor leagues.

Career statistics

Regular season and playoffs

See also
 List of players who played only one game in the NHL

External links
 

1927 births
2007 deaths
Canadian expatriate ice hockey players in the United States
Canadian ice hockey defencemen
Fort Wayne Komets players
Louisville Blades players
New York Rangers players
New York Rovers players
San Diego Skyhawks players
Ice hockey people from Winnipeg
Stratford Kroehlers players
Toledo Mercurys players